Operations Research Letters is a bimonthly peer-reviewed academic journal covering operations research. It was established in 1981 and is published by Elsevier. The editor-in-chief is Amy Ward.

Abstracting and indexing
The journal is indexed and abstracted in:

References

External links

Industrial engineering journals
Elsevier academic journals
English-language journals
Bimonthly journals
Publications established in 1981